Zhirkovsky is a rural locality (a khutor) in Verkhnecherenskoye Rural Settlement, Kletsky District, Volgograd Oblast, Russia. The population was 165 as of 2010. There are 6 streets.

Geography 
Zhirkovsky is located on the bank of the Tsaritsa River, 50 km west of Kletskaya (the district's administrative centre) by road. Srednetsaritsynsky is the nearest rural locality.

References 

Rural localities in Kletsky District